Kali Davis-White (born October 27, 1994) is a sprint athlete, who specializes in the 60 meters, 100 meters, and 200 meters.  She competes for the Tennessee Volunteers.

Career

College
Kali Davis-White started her college career at Florida State University in the 2014 season.  After her sophomore year at Florida State, she transferred to Tennessee where she competed in 2016.

Professional
Davis-White was born and competed for the United States as a Junior athlete.  She qualified for the 2012 World Junior Championships in the 200 meters for the United States.  Both of her parents were born in Jamaica allowing her to compete for either the U.S. or Jamaica.  She qualified for Jamaica at the 2016 Olympics in the 200 meters with a time of 22.94 seconds.

See also
Jamaica at the 2016 Summer Olympics

References

External links

1994 births
Living people
People from Lauderdale Lakes, Florida
Track and field athletes from Florida
American female sprinters
Jamaican female sprinters
Athletes (track and field) at the 2016 Summer Olympics
Olympic athletes of Jamaica
21st-century American women
Sportspeople from Broward County, Florida